Christina M. Tchen (born January 25, 1956) is an American lawyer and a former official in the President Barack Obama Administration. She was CEO of Time's Up from 2019 to 2021, when she resigned following allegations that she provided legal aid to former New York Governor Andrew Cuomo when sexual harassment allegations were made public.  Her work centers on issues related to gender inequity, sexual harassment, and lack of diversity in the workplace.

Early life and education
Tchen was born in Columbus, Ohio on January 25, 1956, to Chinese immigrants of Shanghainese descent who fled the People's Republic of China in 1949. Her father Peter Chou-Yen Tchen worked as a psychiatrist and her mother Lily was a scientist (chemistry from Syracuse University). In 1956 her father was facing deportation back to China but received help from Ohio Senator John Bricker. She grew up in Beachwood, Ohio, graduating from Beachwood High School in 1974. She graduated from Radcliffe College of Harvard University in 1978, and received her J.D. degree in 1984 from Northwestern University School of Law.

Career
Tchen worked for several years for the Illinois Bureau of the Budget where she served as the Governor's budget analyst for the Department of Children and Family Services. In 1988, Tchen began as an associate at Skadden, Arps, Slate, Meagher & Flom, later becoming a partner at the firm in 1992, where she specialized in litigation in the federal courts. In 1992, she argued on behalf of the State of Illinois in front of the Supreme Court of the United States in Artist M. v. Suter, which helped reform the state's foster care program by closing a loophole.

During President Obama's campaign in 2008, Tchen was one of his biggest fundraisers, raising $200,000. From Obama's inauguration in 2009 until January 5, 2011, she was the Director of the White House Office of Public Engagement, previously known as the Office of Public Liaison. From 2011 until 2017, she served as Assistant to President Barack Obama; Chief of Staff to First Lady Michelle Obama; and Executive Director of the White House Council on Women and Girls.

In 2017, she became a partner in the law firm Buckley Sander where she led the workplace culture practice and was head of the firm's Chicago office. In 2018, she was one of the co-founders of Time's Up and led its legal defense fund that connected victims of sexual harassment with lawyers. The fund has raised more than $24 million by 2019 and has connected more than 3,600 workers in various industries to legal support for sexual harassment cases.

In March 2019, Tchen was hired as an adviser to investigate the Southern Poverty Law Center's (SPLC) "workplace culture" after allegations of sexual and racial harassment led to the firing of the SPLC's co-founder and resignation of its president. Also that year, she was named chair of the Recording Academy's new task force for inclusion and diversity following Neil Portnow and Ken Ehrlich's disparaging comments about women in the music industry.

On October 7, 2019, Tchen was appointed chief executive officer of Time's Up. Tchen's leadership has come under scrutiny amid revelations of assisting prominent Democratic politicians Andrew Cuomo and Joe Biden about the response to women who were publicly accusing them of sexual misconduct. She resigned on August 26, 2021, in the wake of Cuomo's resignation when it was revealed Tchen worked with the governor to discredit his first accuser.

Awards and recognition 

 Chicago Lawyer "Person of the Year", 1994
 "Women of Achievement" award from the Anti-Defamation League, 1996
 Leadership Award from the Women's Bar Association of Illinois, 1999
 American Bar Association's Margaret Brent Women Lawyers of Achievement Award, 2018

Boards and commissions
 Chicago Bar Association Foundation
 Chicago Public Library (trustee)
 Chinese American Service League (board member)
 Judicial Nominations Commission for the Northern District of Illinois

References

External links

Profile at White House Office of Public Engagement and Intergovernmental Affairs at WhiteHouse.gov
Council on Women and Girls at WhiteHouse.gov

Joining the Office of the First Lady, Tina Tchen, WhiteHouse.gov, January 5, 2011

 Tina Tchen  Video produced by Makers: Women Who Make America

1956 births
20th-century American Episcopalians
21st-century American Episcopalians
American politicians of Chinese descent
Asian-American people in Illinois politics
Illinois Democrats
Illinois lawyers
Lawyers from Cleveland
Living people
Northwestern University Pritzker School of Law alumni
Obama administration personnel
Radcliffe College alumni
Skadden, Arps, Slate, Meagher & Flom people
American lawyers of Chinese descent
People from Beachwood, Ohio